Francis Joseph Wing (September 14, 1850 – February 2, 1918) was a United States district judge of the United States District Court for the Northern District of Ohio.

Education and career

Born in North Bloomfield, Ohio, Wing was educated at Phillips Academy, and Harvard University. He read law with Caleb Blodgett at Boston, Massachusetts, Judge Buckingham of Newark, New Jersey and Edward O. Fitch of Ashtabula, Ohio. He was admitted to the bar in 1874. He was in private practice in Cleveland, Ohio from 1874 to 1899. He was an Assistant United States Attorney of the Northern District of Ohio from 1880 to 1881. He was a Judge of the Cuyahoga County Court of Common Pleas from 1899 to 1901. He was Republican in politics.

Federal judicial service

He was confirmed by the United States Senate on January 23, 1901, and received his commission the same day. His service terminated on February 1, 1905, due to his resignation.

Later career and death

Following his resignation from the federal bench, Wing resumed private practice in Cleveland. He died on February 2, 1918.

Family

Wing married Mary Brackett Remington of Cleveland September 25, 1878. They had three daughters named Virginia Remington, Marie Remington, and Stephanie Remington.

References

Sources
 

1850 births
1918 deaths
Harvard University alumni
Ohio state court judges
Ohio Republicans
Phillips Academy alumni
Judges of the United States District Court for the Northern District of Ohio
United States federal judges appointed by William McKinley
Lawyers from Cleveland
United States federal judges admitted to the practice of law by reading law
Assistant United States Attorneys